Aleksander Chudek (17 August 1914 – 23 June 1944) was a Polish fighter ace of the Royal Air Force in World War II with 9 confirmed kills.

Biography
Before World War II Chudek served in Polish 114th Fighter Escadrille. After the Soviet invasion of Poland he crossed the border with Romania, then he came to France and finally, on 27 June 1940, arrived in the United Kingdom. After a brief exchange rate, he has been assigned to an auxiliary unit of the RAF as a pilot distributing new or refurbished aircraft at airports across the UK. In June 1941 he was transferred to No. 55 Operational Training Unit and began training on Hurricane. In July he was assigned to No. 315 Polish Fighter Squadron where he flew Spitfires. On 14 August 1941 he shot down his first plane. In July 1943 he was posted for three months in No. 303 Polish Fighter Squadron. On  23 June 1944 he flew over Normandy and never came back. Initially it was thought that his plane fell into the sea, but in 2009 it was found that the plane crashed between the towns of Le Plessis-Grimoult and Roucamps.

On 23 June 2009, 65 years after the crash, a monument dedicated to Aleksander Chudek was erected in Le Plessis-Grimoult.

Aerial victory credits
 Bf 109 – 14 August 1941 and 1 damaged
 Bf 109 (two) – 29 August 1941 
 Bf 109 – 16 September 1941 
 Fw 190 – 27 September 1941 (probably destroyed)
 Fw 190 – 21 October 1941 
 Fw 190 (two) – 17 August 1943 
 Fw 190 – 6 September 1943 
 Fw 190 – 23 September 1943

Chudek is credited with destroying nine enemy aircraft, with one probably destroyed and another damaged.

Awards
 Virtuti Militari, Silver Cross 
 Cross of Valour (Poland), four times
 Distinguished Flying Medal

References

Bibliography
 Tadeusz Jerzy Krzystek, Anna Krzystek: Polskie Siły Powietrzne w Wielkiej Brytanii w latach 1940-1947 łącznie z Pomocniczą Lotniczą Służbą Kobiet (PLSK-WAAF). Sandomierz: Stratus, 2012, s. 131. 
 Piotr Sikora: Asy polskiego lotnictwa. Warszawa: Oficyna Wydawnicza Alma-Press. 2014, s. 218-222. 
 Józef Zieliński: Asy polskiego lotnictwa. Warszawa: Agencja lotnicza ALTAIR, 1994, s. 25. ISBN 83862172.

Further reading
 Cumft O., Kujawa H. K. ''Księga lotników polskich 1939-1946, Wydawnictwo MON, Warszawa 1989
 

Recipients of the Distinguished Flying Medal
Polish World War II flying aces
Recipients of the Silver Cross of the Virtuti Militari
Recipients of the Cross of Valour (Poland)
1944 deaths
1914 births
Polish military personnel of World War II
Royal Air Force pilots of World War II
Royal Air Force personnel killed in World War II